Belle River District High School, in Belle River, Ontario is part of the Greater Essex County District School Board. Belle River DHS feeder schools include Belle River Public School, Centennial Central Public School and Lakeshore Discovery School.

Facility 
Located at 333 South Street, Belle River Ontario, Canada, The school was built in 1947 with numerous additions in 1953, 1957, 1963, 1966, 1973, 1975 and 1998. 
The building itself has two gyms, a weight room, a library, a large cafetorium, a wood shop, a metal shop, as well as a greenhouse. The site has a track and football field at the rear of the property as well as a soccer field and tennis court on the north side of the property.

External links
Belle River District High School

High schools in Essex County, Ontario